Gregory Allen Jackson (born August 20, 1966) is an American football coach who is the safeties coach for the Houston Texans of the National Football League (NFL). Jackson is also a former player who played safety in the NFL for 12 seasons for the New York Giants, San Diego Chargers, Philadelphia Eagles, and New Orleans Saints. He was drafted by the Giants in the third round of the 1989 NFL Draft and played college football at LSU.

Playing career
In 1994, he took over from Wes Hopkins as the starting free safety of the Philadelphia Eagles, and played there the following year, until he was replaced by rookie Brian Dawkins. Jackson is also known for making the tackle against Emmitt Smith that sprained his shoulder in the final regular season game of the 1993 season. Smith went on to run for 229 yards with said shoulder injury, giving the Cowboys a much needed first round bye in the playoffs on their way to a second straight Super Bowl, Super Bowl XXVIII. This is known as one of the Dallas Cowboys' greatest games.

Coaching career
Jackson was hired as assistant secondary coach by the San Francisco 49ers on February 17, 2011. After Jim Harbaugh left the 49ers to coach at the University of Michigan, he brought Jackson with him to serve as the secondary coach.

In 2016, Jackson returned to the NFL when he was hired to be the safeties coach for the Dallas Cowboys. When Jason Garrett was fired in 2020 Jackson was let go from the team. Jackson was hired by the Houston Texans as their safeties coach on March 10, 2021.

References

1966 births
Living people
American football safeties
Dallas Cowboys coaches
Houston Texans coaches
Idaho Vandals football coaches
Louisiana–Monroe Warhawks football coaches
LSU Tigers football players
Michigan Wolverines football coaches
New Orleans Saints players
New York Giants players
Philadelphia Eagles players
San Diego Chargers players
San Francisco 49ers coaches
Tulane Green Wave football coaches
Wisconsin Badgers football coaches
People from Hialeah, Florida
Players of American football from Florida
African-American coaches of American football
African-American players of American football
21st-century African-American people
20th-century African-American sportspeople